Ramchandra P. N. is a filmmaker making feature films, short films, documentaries and TV programs. in India. He is a Tuluva based in Mumbai.

Early days
Ramchandra Perampalli Neckar was born in the town of Udupi in the erstwhile undivided Dakshina Kannada District (now Udupi District) in the coastal area of the state of Karnataka in southern India, in 1965. His father worked in the Life Insurance Corporation of India; his mother was a housewife. Ramchandra PN completed his education in various schools and colleges in Kota, Kundapura, Mumbai, Manipal, Dharwad and Udupi. He is a commerce graduate from Mangalore University.

Early interests
Ramchandra PN's initial foray into the arts got kindled during his college days in Poornaprajna College, Udupi. After unsuccessful attempts at learning disciplines as varied as the guitar, drawing and the traditional performing art of Yakshagana, he got involved in theatre as an actor as well as a back stage worker in various plays directed by Kannada theatre directors from Coastal Karnataka like B. R. Nagesh, Udyavara Madhava Acharya, Ramdas and R. L. Bhat. Meanwhile, he horned his still photography skills, thanks to a Pentax still camera donated to him by his uncle. He then attuned his creative instincts by attending various theatre workshops conducted by renowned Kannada theatre personalities like Chidambar Rao Jambe and Gangadhar Swamy. For a couple of years, he along with his friends led by theatre activist Udyavara Nagesh Kumar founded a mime troupe that performed in various festival celebrations, in and around the town of Udupi.

Interest in films
But Ramchandra PN's real calling was films. He was an active member of the now-defunct Chitra Samudaya, a Film society that was active in Udupi whose secretary owned a 16 mm projector. By the time he was in his twenties he had already seen classics like The Seventh Seal, Bicycle Thieves, Pather Panchali, Rashomon and Ghatashraddha. At the age of nineteen, he along with his cousin and their friends made a short film called Happy Birthday with a VHS camera loaned by a friend whose father worked in the Middle East. Since they had no editing facilities then, they shot the film in the editing order.

Training in films
Ramchandra PN's growing interests in films took him to Mangalore, Heggodu and Bengaluru where he attended various film appreciation courses conducted by the likes of K. V. Subbanna, Satish Bahadhur, P.K. Nair, Nirad Mahapatra, Hariharan, Girish Kasaravalli and Abdul Rehaman Pasha. Finally, in 1987 dropping out from his Law and Charted Accounting studies, he joined the Film and Television Institute of India, Poona to do a three-year course in Film Direction and Screenplay Writing. His diploma film Gotala was screened in the then Bombay Short and Documentary Film Festival, held in the early 1990s.

Professional life
After graduating from Film and Television Institute of India (FTII), Ramchandra PN thought he would settle down in Bengaluru, the capital of his home state Karnataka. Thanks to a cousin, he sneaked into the mainstream Kannada film industry and worked in the Kannada super star Vishnuvardhan's bilingual film called Police Dada; where he was the 8th assistant to the Hindi film directors Ramsay brothers. But after a schedule of filming, Ramchandra PN found out that commercial mainstream cinema was not his cup of tea.

He came to Mumbai in 1991 and got himself involved in the Television serial Surabhi a cultural show that was experimenting with the TV magazine format, produced by anchor Siddharth Kak. Over the next ten years, as a freelancer, he directed more than hundred short documentaries for this cultural show, subjects mainly pertaining to his home state of Karnataka – on Gangubai Hanagal, Mallikarjun Mansur, Shivaram Karanth, B.V. Karanth, Vijaynath Shenoy's Hastha Shilpa, the Hampi Ruins, the Hoysala Temples, Mysore Ganjifa, the professional stage actresses of Mariyammanahalli, cock fights, the Electronic tampura, the Lokur Joint family in North Karnataka, the Coastal Buffalo race of Kambala among others.

Ramchandra PN has been residing in Mumbai since 1990. Over the years he gradually ventured into other TV programs, feature films, documentaries and short films in English, Hindi, Kannada, Marathi, Bengali, Kutchhi and Tulu languages.

Turning point
Ten years into doing television, Ramchandra PN found himself in the crossroads of his career for he had not yet made his feature film – the very purpose for which he joined FTII in the first place. Taking advantage of the newly developing digital technology, in the year 2004, with the help of his assistant Surendra Kumar Marnad and friend Mohan Marnad he ventured in producing and directing the first digital feature film in Tulu language called Suddha (The Cleansing Rites). This no-cost film went on to win the Best Indian Film at the 2006 Osian's Cinefan Festival of Asian and Arab films that was held in New Delhi. In 2007 it won a modest exhibition Grant from the Hubart Balls fund under which Ramchandra PN went around with a mobile projector, a portable screen and a sound system to screen the film in more than 100 places in the remote villages of the Tulu-speaking districts of Coastal Karnataka.

In 2008, he shot his second feature Putaani Party (The Kid Gang) – this time in Kannada language and in the district of Dharwad in North Karnataka. This film was produced by The Children's Film Society of India. This film won the Best Children's film at the 2009 National Film Awards.

Ramchandra PN has completed his third feature Haal E Kangaal, in Hindi language and is screening it in alternative venues all over India.

Besides, he also conducts academic workshops in various film schools in India like the FTII, Poona & L. V. Prasad Film Institute, Chennai.

Awards
 'Putaani Party' – a Children's film directed by Ramchandra PN has jointly won the Swarna Kamal (Golden Lotus) for the Best Children's Film at the 2009 National Film Awards constituted by the Government of India.
In 2005, Ramchandra PN made a Tulu language digital feature film called Suddha, also known as The Cleansing Rites. This film won the Best Indian Film at the Osian's Cinefan Festival of Asian and Arab Cinema held at New Delhi. The five members jury had given the award for "its poetic, evocative and uncompromising style reflecting the moods of contemporary India."
In 2004, his short film Heart Troubles of Ramchand Yavathmal Tirchuinapalli Azamghar won the best short film at the Abuja International Film Festival, Nigeria.

On Suddha – The Cleansing Rites

The Bangalore edition of the newspaper 'The Hindu had described the film Suddha – The Cleansing Ritesas follows.

"The allure of the 105-minute Tulu film is mainly due to its impressive technical accomplishments. Camerawork by Sameer Mahajan uses light and shade superbly and captures the mood and feel of the story. The interiors of the typical rural house – with peeling walls and old-world appendages – which stand as mute witness of the breaking family have been shot with care and sensitivity."(Source: The Hindu)

Filmography

Feature films

Short fiction

Documentaries

TV programmes

Film reviews
Ramchandra reviews films for Upper Stall

References

External links

official site

1965 births
Living people
20th-century Indian film directors
People from Udupi
Mangaloreans
Tulu people
Film and Television Institute of India alumni
Screenwriters from Karnataka
Film directors from Karnataka
Film producers from Karnataka
Indian television producers
Indian television directors
21st-century Indian film directors
Indian documentary filmmakers
Cinematographers from Karnataka
Directors who won the Best Children's Film National Film Award